Roberto Alejandro Durán (born March 6, 1973) is a Dominican former professional baseball pitcher who played for the Detroit Tigers of Major League Baseball (MLB) in 1997 and 1998. He batted and threw left-handed.

Career
Durán was signed by the Los Angeles Dodgers in 1990 as an amateur free agent. He played in the Dominican Republic for two seasons, then began playing in the United States in Minor League Baseball in 1992. He played in the Dodgers' farm system through the 1995 season.

On March 14, 1996, Durán was selected off waivers by the Toronto Blue Jays. He never made it to the majors with the Jays and ended up being traded on December 11, 1996, to the Detroit Tigers in exchange for minor-leaguer Anton French. In Detroit, Durán made his first major league appearance on July 6, 1997. He finished the year having appeared in 13 games, and holding a 7.59 ERA through  innings pitched.

In 1998, at the age of 25, Durán appeared in 18 games for the Tigers. He lost one game and had a 5.87 ERA through  innings. After that season, on January 1, 1999, the Montreal Expos claimed him off of waivers, but he did not play again in the major leagues. He ended his major-league career with an 0–1 record, a 6.58 ERA, and 23 strikeouts.

Durán last played in the minor leagues in 1999, for three different Montreal farm teams; after not playing professionally in 2000, he played briefly in the Mexican League in 2001, his final professional season.

References

External links

1973 births
Living people
Bakersfield Dodgers players
Detroit Tigers players
Dominican Republic expatriate baseball players in Canada
Dominican Republic expatriate baseball players in Mexico
Dominican Republic expatriate baseball players in the United States
Dunedin Blue Jays players
Gulf Coast Dodgers players
Harrisburg Senators players
Jacksonville Suns players
Jupiter Hammerheads players
Knoxville Smokies players
Lakeland Tigers players
Major League Baseball pitchers
Major League Baseball players from the Dominican Republic
Mexican League baseball pitchers
Ottawa Lynx players
People from Moca, Dominican Republic
Tigres del México players
Toledo Mud Hens players
Vero Beach Dodgers players
Yakima Bears players